The 1983 BMW Championships was a women's tennis tournament played on outdoor grass courts at Devonshire Park in Eastbourne in the United Kingdom that was part of the 1983 Virginia Slims World Championship Series. The tournament was held from 13 June through 19 June 1983. First-seeded Martina Navratilova won the singles title and earned $23,000 first-prize money.

Finals

Singles
 Martina Navratilova defeated  Wendy Turnbull 6–1, 6–1
It was Navratilova's 8th singles title of the year and the 78th of her career.

Doubles
 Martina Navratilova /  Pam Shriver defeated  Jo Durie /  Anne Hobbs 6–1, 6–0
It was Navratilova's 14th title of the year and the 166th of her career. It was Shriver's 1st title of the year and the 41st of her career.

Prize money

References

External links
 Women's Tennis Association (WTA) tournament edition details
 International Tennis Federation (ITF) tournament edition details

BMW Championships
Eastbourne International
BMW Championships
BMW Championships
1983 in English women's sport